Shiller may refer to:

People
 Helen Shiller (born 1947), Chicago politician
 Phil Schiller (born 1960), Apple Inc. executive
 Robert J. Shiller (born 1946), American Nobel-Prize winning economist, academic, and author
 Case–Shiller index
 Shiller P/E, or Cyclically adjusted price-to-earnings ratio

Other uses 
 Kvutzat Shiller, a kibbutz in central Israel
 "Shiller", a 2008 single by Ratatat

See also 
 Schiller (disambiguation)

Germanic-language surnames
Jewish surnames